The 2016 USAC Silver Crown Champ Car Series season was the 45th season of the USAC Silver Crown Series. The series began with the Sumar Classic at the Terre Haute Action Track on April 3, and ended with the 4 Crown Nationals at Eldora Speedway on September 24. Kody Swanson entered the 2016 season as the defending champion, and Chris Windom was the season champion.

Schedule/Results

Teams/Drivers

References

USAC Silver Crown Series
United States Auto Club